Strontium nitrate is an inorganic compound composed of the elements strontium, nitrogen and oxygen with the formula Sr(NO3)2.  This colorless solid is used as a red colorant and oxidizer in pyrotechnics.

Preparation
Strontium nitrate is typically generated by the reaction of nitric acid on strontium carbonate.
 2 HNO3 + SrCO3 → Sr(NO3)2 + H2O + CO2

Uses 
Like many other strontium salts, strontium nitrate is used to produce a rich red flame in fireworks and road flares. The oxidizing properties of this salt are advantageous in such applications. 
	
Strontium nitrate can aid in eliminating and lessening skin irritations. When mixed with glycolic acid, strontium nitrate reduces the sensation of skin irritation significantly better than using glycolic acid alone.

Biochemistry
As a divalent ion with an ionic radius similar to that of Ca2+ (1.13 Å and 0.99 Å respectively), Sr2+ ions resembles calcium's ability to traverse calcium-selective ion channels and trigger neurotransmitter release from nerve endings. It is thus used in electrophysiology experiments.

In popular culture
In his short story "A Germ-Destroyer", Rudyard Kipling refers to strontium nitrate as the main ingredient of the titular fumigant.

References

Nitrates
Oxidizing agents
Pyrotechnic colorants
Pyrotechnic oxidizers
Strontium compounds